Édouard Chammougon (born 10 January 1937 in Baie Mahault, Guadeloupe) is a politician from Guadeloupe who served in the French National Assembly from 1993 to 1994.

References 

Édouard Chammougon page on the French National Assembly website

1937 births
Living people
People from Baie-Mahault
Guadeloupean politicians
Rally for the Republic politicians
Deputies of the 8th National Assembly of the French Fifth Republic
Deputies of the 10th National Assembly of the French Fifth Republic